Frederick McEvoy (4 July 1856 – 5 November 1913) was an Australian cricketer. He played one first-class cricket match for Victoria in 1877.

See also
 List of Victoria first-class cricketers

References

External links
 

1856 births
1913 deaths
Australian cricketers
Victoria cricketers
People from the Riverina
Melbourne Cricket Club cricketers
Cricketers from New South Wales